Fontella may refer to:
Fontella Bass (1940–2012), American soul singer
Fontellas, municipality in Navarre, Spain